José Beaurain (born 27 July 1971) is a French politician of the National Rally (RN) and disability rights campaigner. He has been Member of the National Assembly for Aisne's 4th constituency following the 2022 French legislative election. Beaurain was the first blind person elected as a deputy of the French Fifth Republic.

Biography
Beaurain is a piano tuner by profession and also practices bodybuilding. He won several local bodybuilding contests and was president of a sports union for disabled people in France. Beaurain was born visually impaired due to congenital glaucoma and completely lost his sight in 2008. He has focused on issues faced by people with disabilities during his political career. 

Beaurain joined the RN in the 2010s. In 2014, he was elected as a municipal councilor for the party in Chauny. During the 2022 French elections to the National Assembly, Beaurain contested the seat of Asine's 4th constituency and defeated En Marche incumbent deputy Marc Delatte during the second round.

See also 

 List of deputies of the 16th National Assembly of France

References 

Living people
1971 births
Deputies of the 16th National Assembly of the French Fifth Republic
21st-century French politicians
National Rally (France) politicians
Blind politicians
French bodybuilders
French blind people